Grace Under Pressure may refer to:

 Grace Under Pressure (Rush album), a 1984 music album by Rush
 Grace Under Pressure (John Scofield album), a 1992 music album by John Scofield
 "Grace Under Pressure" (Stargate Atlantis), a Stargate Atlantis episode
 "Grace Under Pressure", song by Elbow, from the album Cast of Thousands
 "Grace Under Pressure", song by Eternal, from the album Before the Rain
 "Grace Under Pressure", an episode of the TV series Hill Street Blues celebrating a founding cast member who had died